Gu Beibei (born November 25, 1980 in Beijing) is a Chinese synchronized swimmer.

She represented China at the 2004 Summer Olympics in Athens, and has qualified for the 2008 Summer Olympics.

See also 
China at the 2008 Summer Olympics

References

External links 
 
 
 

1980 births
Living people
Chinese synchronized swimmers
Olympic bronze medalists for China
Olympic synchronized swimmers of China
Synchronized swimmers from Beijing
Synchronized swimmers at the 2004 Summer Olympics
Synchronized swimmers at the 2008 Summer Olympics
Olympic medalists in synchronized swimming
Asian Games medalists in artistic swimming
Artistic swimmers at the 2002 Asian Games
Artistic swimmers at the 2006 Asian Games
Medalists at the 2008 Summer Olympics
Medalists at the 2002 Asian Games
Medalists at the 2006 Asian Games
Asian Games gold medalists for China
Asian Games silver medalists for China